Edgeout Records (stylized as EDGEOUT Records) is an American independent record label, founded by Tony Guanci and Cheryl Benson-Guanci in 2018. Its releases are distributed through Universal Music Group, with which it signed an exclusive global label services agreement in December 2018. 

Edgeout can sign bands it will "upstream" to one of Universal's labels, or alternately, it has distribution division that provides services to bands/artists that meet specific criteria. The label also runs an artist development program called The Studio, which it uses to identify potential signees. Edgeout also signs established artists with specialty projects and musicians to sole distribution deals.

Based in Los Angeles, California, Edgeout opened a second location in Nashville, Tennessee on October 12, 2021.

Label activity, 2019-present
Edgeout announced its first signing, The Jacks, in January 2019. The Jacks debut EP single, "Walk Away," premiered May 17, 2019.It came from their debut, self-titled EP, released June 28, 2019. The album was produced by Grammy- Nominated  Matt Wallace and mixed by Grammy-Winner,  Andrew Scheps at Los Angeles’ Sunset Sound Recorders. In November 2019, the band released a holiday single, a rock version of "In the Bleak Midwinter," based on an 1872 work by English poet Christina Rossetti. In advance of their second EP, Remember You, the group released the first single “Just A Little Bit” on January 23, 2020. and followed up with their second single Threw It All Away on March 3, 2020. The EP was released on March 6, 2020, and was produced by Grammy Award-winner Joe Chiccarelli.

The Jacks followed up on September 17, 2021 with a specialty-project album, titled Slowdance.

The label signed its second band, The Revelries, a pop-rock/alternative band in the winter of 2019. The Revelries first single "Cliché Love" was released on April 30, 2021, followed by several further single releases. On May 6th, 2022- the band released "Best For You."
The Revelries prior singles have recently been compiled into a self-titled album, The Revelries on September 9, 2022. 

Edgeout signed its first established artist, DJ Ashba, in March 2020. Ashba released his debut single, "Hypnotic (Ft. Cali Tucker)" on August 14, 2020. Ashba will be releasing several more singles, all with different vocalists, in the coming months. Ashba's second single, "Let's Dance (Ft. James Michael)" was released October 16, 2020, and the official music video was released on October 23, 2020. Ashba released his latest single, titled "Bella Ciao" on October 29, 2021. ASHBA then released 'MALOSA' on July 29,2022. 

The label announced their newly signed band, Bluphoria, on February 1, 2021. The Alternative Blues/ Psych Rock band is from Eugene, OR, and is a quartet of college students. Bluphoria released their debut single under EDGEOU, titled 'Set Me Up' on August 19, 2022. 

Northern California alternative pop-punk trio Stratejacket signed to Edgeout Records in September 2021.

In December 2021, Edgeout released a holiday EP, titled Rock'n Holiday. The EP features three holiday tracks, including Ashba's "A Christmas Storm," The Revelries "Jingle Bells" and The Jacks "In The Bleak Midwinter."

Artists
Ashba
Bluphoria
The Jacks
The Revelries
Stratejacket

References

American record labels
Rock record labels